Pierre-Richard Gaetjens (born 26 June 1955) is a Haitian sprinter. He competed in the men's 100 metres at the 1972 Summer Olympics.

References

1955 births
Living people
Athletes (track and field) at the 1972 Summer Olympics
Haitian male sprinters
Olympic athletes of Haiti
Place of birth missing (living people)